Hammond Township may refer to the following townships in the United States:

 Hammond Township, Polk County, Minnesota
 Hammond Township, Spencer County, Indiana